Michael Tye (born 1950) is a British philosopher who is currently Professor of Philosophy at the University of Texas at Austin. He has made significant contributions to the philosophy of mind.

Education and career

Tye completed his undergraduate education at Oxford University in England, studying first physics and then physics and philosophy. He went on to complete a PhD in philosophy at the State University of New York, Stony Brook.  Before moving to Texas, Tye taught at Haverford College in suburban Philadelphia and Temple University in Philadelphia proper. He was also a visiting professor at King's College, London for some ten consecutive years while at Temple and briefly took up a chair at the University of St. Andrews. Besides philosophy of mind, Tye has interests in cognitive science, metaphysics, and philosophical logic, especially problems relating to vagueness.

Tye's third book, Ten Problems of Consciousness (1995), was an alternate selection of the Library of Science Book Club.

Philosophical work

Along with Fred Dretske and William Lycan, Tye defends the representationalist view of consciousness, more precisely what has been called the "strong" representationalist view, according to which "representation of a certain kind suffices for a sensory quality, where the kind can be specified in functionalist or other familiar materialist terms, without recourse to properties of any ontologically 'new' sort."

Animal consciousness

Tye has authored papers on animal consciousness and pain in animals. He is the author of the book, Tense Bees and Shell-Shocked Crabs: Are Animals Conscious?, published in 2016. The book defends the hypothesis that consciousness extends a considerable way down the phylogenetic scale, focusing mainly on felt pain as criteria. He states that we should attribute pain to animals if they behave similarly to humans in context where we know that humans feel pain. He has reviewed scientific studies and concludes that arthropods, birds, mammals, reptiles and some fish are conscious.

According to Tye, teleost fish feel pain but elasmobranchs and insects do not. Tye has commented that "insects do not react to treatment that would undoubtedly cause severe pain in mammals. So, there is reason to doubt that generally insects feel pain." In Chapter 11 of Tense Bees and Shell-Shocked Crabs: Are Animals Conscious?, Tye argues in favour of vegetarianism.

Tye's book has been reviewed in Metascience and PsycCRITIQUES.

Books 

 The Metaphysics of Mind (1989)
 The Imagery Debate (1991)
 Ten Problems of Consciousness (1995)
 Consciousness, Color, and Content (2000)
 Consciousness and Persons (2003)
 Consciousness Revisited: Materialism without Phenomenal Concepts (2009)
 Tense Bees and Shell-Shocked Crabs:  Are Animals Conscious? (2016)

See also

 Qualia
 Consciousness
 Naïve realism
 Fred Dretske
 Philosophy of mind
 Mind–body problem

References

External links
 Michael Tye's personal webpage (includes articles for download).
 Stanford Encyclopedia of Philosophy entry on Qualia
 Interview for Mind and Consciousness
 A review of Consciousness, Colour, and Content by Bill Brewer of Oxford University.

Living people
1950 births
20th-century British philosophers
21st-century British philosophers
Animal cognition writers
Animal ethicists
Analytic philosophers
British animal rights scholars
British vegetarianism activists
British consciousness researchers and theorists
Philosophers of mind
Haverford College faculty
Materialists
Temple University faculty